Amraica solivagaria is a species of geometer moths in the Ennominae subfamily.

Characteristics
The males have the characteristic brownish-red patches at the base and apex of the forewing contrasting with a pale gray ground, while the females are more uniform pale brown with the apical and basal forewing patches less distinct and with the post- and antemedial fasciae more clearly delineated with black.

Distribution and habitat
It is found in Borneo and Sulawesi in the lowlands and hill forests.

External links
The Moths of Borneo

References 

Moths described in 1866
Moths of Borneo
Moths of Indonesia
Boarmiini